Beckwourth (formerly, Beckwith and Beekwith) is a census-designated place (CDP) in Plumas County, California, United States. The population was 432 at the 2010 census, up from 342 at the 2000 census.

Name
The community was named for James P. Beckwourth, an explorer who discovered Beckwourth Pass in 1851.

History
The Beckwith post office opened in 1870 and changed its name to Beckwourth in 1932.

Geography
Beckwourth is located at  (39.827528, -120.403710).

Nervino Airport (FAA identifier: O02 or oscar-zero-two) is plotted three quarters of a mile east of Beckwourth along State Route 70 on the Reconnaissance Peak, California 7.5 minute quadrangle. The US Geological Survey says variant names for the airport are Beckwourth Airport and Plumas County Airport.

State facilities in the town include a State of California, Department of Water Resources maintenance yard and a Caltrans Maintenance Station. These appear to be colocated (at the same site).

Climate
This region experiences warm (but not hot) and dry summers, with no average monthly temperatures above 71.6 °F.  According to the Köppen Climate Classification system, Beckwourth has a warm-summer Mediterranean climate, abbreviated "Csb" on climate maps.

Demographics

2010
The 2010 United States Census reported that Beckwourth had a population of 432. The racial makeup of Beckwourth was 402 (93.1%) White, 0 (0.0%) African American, 11 (2.5%) Native American, 2 (0.5%) Asian, 1 (0.2%) Pacific Islander, 7 (1.6%) from other races, and 9 (2.1%) from two or more races. Hispanic or Latino of any race were 29 persons (6.7%).

The Census reported that 432 people (100% of the population) lived in households, 0 (0%) lived in non-institutionalized group quarters, and 0 (0%) were institutionalized.

There were 196 households, out of which 41 (20.9%) had children under the age of 18 living in them, 111 (56.6%) were opposite-sex married couples living together, 9 (4.6%) had a female householder with no husband present, 11 (5.6%) had a male householder with no wife present.  There were 8 (4.1%) unmarried opposite-sex partnerships, and 0 (0%) same-sex married couples or partnerships. 53 households (27.0%) were made up of individuals, and 15 (7.7%) had someone living alone who was 65 years of age or older. The average household size was 2.20.  There were 131 families (66.8% of all households); the average family size was 2.64.

The population was spread out, with 71 people (16.4%) under the age of 18, 14 people (3.2%) aged 18 to 24, 72 people (16.7%) aged 25 to 44, 177 people (41.0%) aged 45 to 64, and 98 people (22.7%) who were 65 years of age or older.  The median age was 53.9 years. For every 100 females, there were 118.2 males.  For every 100 females age 18 and over, there were 121.5 males.

The homeowner vacancy rate was 8.6%; the rental vacancy rate was 0%.  363 people (84.0% of the population) lived in owner-occupied housing units and 69 people (16.0%) lived in rental housing units.

2000
As of the census of 2000, there were 342 people, 147 households, and 108 families residing in the CDP. There were 225 housing units at an average density of 19.3 per square mile (7.4/km2). The racial makeup of the CDP was 93.86% White, 2.05% Native American, 0.88% Pacific Islander, 1.46% from other races, and 1.75% from two or more races.  2.92% of the population were Hispanic or Latino of any race.

There were 147 households, out of which 23.8% had children under the age of 18 living with them, 66.0% were married couples living together, 5.4% had a female householder with no husband present, and 25.9% were non-families. 19.7% of all households were made up of individuals, and 10.9% had someone living alone who was 65 years of age or older.  The average household size was 2.33 and the average family size was 2.67.

In the CDP, the population was spread out, with 19.0% under the age of 18, 3.5% from 18 to 24, 21.3% from 25 to 44, 33.6% from 45 to 64, and 22.5% who were 65 years of age or older.  The median age was 48 years. For every 100 females, there were 94.3 males.  For every 100 females age 18 and over, there were 100.7 males.

The median income for a household in the CDP was $47,813, and the median income for a family was $52,031. Males had a median income of $49,219 versus $31,250 for females. The per capita income for the CDP was $16,928.  None of the families and 2.8% of the population were living below the poverty line, including no under eighteens and 4.8% of those over 64.

Politics

See also
 Beckwourth Pass
 State Route 70
 Hallelujah Junction, California
 Loyalton, California
 Plumas National Forest
 Portola, California
 Vinton, California

Notable people
 Jim Beckwourth, mountain man, fur trader, and explorer
 Alice Marble, a World Number One American tennis player who won 18 Grand Slam championships

References

External links
 Hotels

Census-designated places in Plumas County, California
Census-designated places in California